Clayton Ike Bennett (born 1959) is an American businessman and chairman of the Professional Basketball Club LLC, the ownership group of the Oklahoma City Thunder, an NBA franchise formerly known as the Seattle SuperSonics. Bennett is the chairman of Oklahoma City-based Dorchester Capital Corporation, as well as the chairman emeritus of the board of directors of the Oklahoma Heritage Association and served as chairman of the Board of Regents of the University of Oklahoma from 2011–2019.

Early business career highlights 

Bennett was one of the owners of the San Antonio Spurs in the mid-1990s, where one of his primary duties was to represent the team on the NBA Board of Governors.  Immediately prior to the 2005–06 NBA season, Bennett, along with Aubrey McClendon of Oklahoma City-based Chesapeake Energy Corporation, Tom L. Ward of Oklahoma City-based SandRidge Energy Corporation, and G. Jeffrey Records Jr. of Oklahoma City-based MidFirst Bank, partnered with the city of Oklahoma City and the state of Oklahoma in providing a revenue guarantee for the NBA's New Orleans Hornets. This resulted in the relocation of the Hornets to Oklahoma City for two seasons.  The temporary relocation to Oklahoma City stemmed from damage to the arena and infrastructure in New Orleans caused by Hurricane Katrina.

Ownership of the Oklahoma City Thunder 

Bennett is the chairman of the Oklahoma City-based Professional Basketball Club LLC (PBC), which owns the NBA's Oklahoma City Thunder. Formerly known as the Seattle SuperSonics, the team was purchased from Howard Schultz in 2006 for approximately $350 million with Bennett promising a good-faith effort to keep the team in Seattle, provided there would be a public commitment to a new arena. After failing to get $500 million in public funding from local taxes to build a new suburban arena for the team, Bennett notified the NBA on November 2, 2007, of the ownership group's intent to move the team to Oklahoma City.  On March 21, 2008, Bennett made known his plan to relocate the basketball franchise. On April 18, 2008, NBA owners gave approval for moving the franchise from Seattle for the 2008–2009 season pending the outcome of the city's case to uphold the lease and the former ownership group's lawsuit to rescind the purchase. On July 2, 2008, Bennett's ownership group reached a settlement agreement in the lawsuit filed by the city of Seattle, thus allowing the franchise to move from Seattle to Oklahoma City.

On April 15, 2011, Bennett was named chairman of the NBA's relocation committee.

On May 15, 2013, Bennett was a part of the board of governors that voted, 22–8, against a proposed relocation of the Sacramento Kings to Seattle.

Personal life 

Bennett is married to Louise Gaylord Bennett, the daughter of Oklahoma City media mogul Edward L. Gaylord. Bennett and Louise Gaylord were high school sweethearts, meeting when he was a sophomore and she was a freshman. They have three children. As of August 2021, Bennett's daughter-in law, Alex Bennett, entered an agreement with Barstool Sports to create digital content. Bennett's in-laws also have ties to professional sports ownership, as the Gaylords once owned a minority share of the Texas Rangers—a share which was later sold to future Republican President George W. Bush. Bennett is a Republican. Bennett is chairman of a task force identifying and seeking criminal justice reforms to alleviate jail overcrowding in Oklahoma City.

References

External links 
 Dorchester Capital
 The Professional Basketball Club, LLC, NBA.com/Thunder
 Where the Thunder Comes Dribbling Down the Plain, New York Times, October 25, 2008
 Clayton Bennett, 2008 Oklahoman of the Year, from Oklahoma Today

American chief executives of professional sports organizations
American financiers
Living people
American investors
American money managers
American billionaires
National Basketball Association executives
Oklahoma City Thunder owners
Businesspeople from Oklahoma City
Women's National Basketball Association executives
1960 births
Oklahoma Republicans
Seattle SuperSonics owners
San Antonio Spurs owners
Gaylord family
Seattle Storm owners